Tanedra Howard (born August 15, 1980) is an American actress. She is best known for winning the reality show Scream Queens and playing Simone Bethson in Saw VI and Saw 3D.

Life and career
Howard was born and raised in Inglewood, California.  She attended Santa Monica College, where she was a member of the cheer squad, and El Camino College.

In 2006, Howard was one out of 500 actors chosen to try out for the ABC reality show I Wanna Be a Soap Star 3, but did not make it on the show. In 2008, Howard's roommate showed her an ad on Craigslist where Lionsgate was holding auditions for the VH1 acting competition reality TV show Scream Queens. She had no acting experience but auditioned and was cast. Howard spent five and half weeks competing in weekly challenges with nine other actors and won the competition earning a role in Saw VI. In the film, she played the part of Simone. She reprises her role in Saw 3D, released on October 29, 2010.

Filmography

References

External links
 

1980 births
Living people
Participants in American reality television series
Reality casting show winners
El Camino College alumni
Actresses from Inglewood, California
21st-century American actresses
African-American actresses
American television actresses
American film actresses
21st-century African-American women
21st-century African-American people
20th-century African-American people
20th-century African-American women